The Ngombal, also known as the Ngumbarl, are an Aboriginal Australian people of Western Australia.

Language
Adequate documentation of the Ngombal language is lacking, but the evidence suggests it was one of the Nyulnyulan languages, with William B. McGregor speculating that it may have belonged to the western branch.

Country
They were a coastal people with an inland territorial reach of about 30 miles, located between the Djaberadjabera to their north, the Nimanburu to the east, the Yawuru to the southeast and the Djugun to their south.

Alternative names
 Ngormbal.
 Ngombaru.
 Ngumbarl.

Notes

Citations

Sources

Aboriginal peoples of Western Australia